John David O'Neal IV is an American politician who served as a member of the West Virginia House of Delegates for the 28th district from 2013 to 2018. O'Neal served consecutively from January 2011 until January 2013 in the District 27 seat.

Education
Born in Hinton, West Virginia, O'Neal earned his Bachelor of Arts degree in political science from Alderson Broaddus College and a Master of Arts in religion from Liberty University.

Elections
2012 Redistricted to District 28, O'Neal ran in the three-way May 8, 2012 Republican Primary and placed first with 1,341 votes (40.9%), and placed first in the four-way two-position November 6, 2012 General election with 8,189 votes (28.9%) ahead of fellow Republican Roy Cooper (who had run in District 26 in 2010) and Democratic nominees Jeffry Pritt and Al Martine.
2010 O'Neal ran in the four-way May 11, 2010 Republican Primary and placed third with 1,558 votes (22.5%), and placed fourth in the nine-way five-position November 2, 2010 General election behind Linda Sumner (R), Rick Snuffer (R), and Rick Moye (D).

References

External links
Official page at the West Virginia Legislature

John O'Neal at Ballotpedia
John David O'Neal IV at the National Institute on Money in State Politics

Year of birth missing (living people)
Living people
Alderson Broaddus University alumni
Liberty University alumni
Republican Party members of the West Virginia House of Delegates
Politicians from Beckley, West Virginia
People from Hinton, West Virginia
21st-century American politicians